The ASUN-WAC Football Conference is the tentative name for an NCAA Division I FCS Football conference. The conference will be a merger of the existing football leagues of the ASUN Conference and Western Athletic Conference. The ASUN-WAC will cover the southwestern, western, and southern United States with member institutions located in Arkansas, Alabama, Kentucky, Tennessee, Texas, and Utah.

History

Western Athletic Conference
On January 14, 2021, the WAC announced its intention to reinstate football as a conference-sponsored sport at the FCS level, as well as the addition of five new members to the conference in all sports, including football. The new members announced include the "Texas Four" of Abilene Christian University, Lamar University, Sam Houston State University, and Stephen F. Austin State University, then members of the Southland Conference, along with Southern Utah University, from the Big Sky Conference. Originally, all schools were planned to join in July 2022, but the entry of the Texas Four was moved to July 2021 after the Southland expelled its departing members. The WAC also announced that it would most likely add another football-playing institution at a later date.

On the same day, news broke that the University of Texas Rio Grande Valley, a non-football playing WAC member, had committed to create an FCS football program by 2024. UTRGV eventually delayed its first football season to 2025.

The WAC ultimately partnered with the ASUN Conference to reestablish its football league, with the Texas Four being joined by three incoming ASUN members for at least the fall 2021 season in what it calls the ASUN–WAC (or WAC–ASUN) Challenge. The Challenge was abbreviated as "AQ7", as the top finisher of the seven teams would be an automatic qualifier for the FCS postseason. The two conferences renewed their alliance for the 2022 season, although both leagues will conduct separate conference seasons and then choose the alliance's automatic qualifier by an as-yet-undetermined process. Both the WAC and ASUN initially planned to have 6 playoff-eligible teams in 2022, but each lost such a member with the start of FBS transitions by Jacksonville State and Sam Houston.

On November 5, 2021, it was reported that New Mexico State (an FBS Independent) and Sam Houston would be leaving the WAC for Conference USA in 2023. The WAC responded by adding, football playing, Incarnate Word from the Southland Conference and non-football school, UT Arlington from the Sun Belt Conference; however, UIW later reversed course and decided to stay with the SLC only days before the 2022-23 athletic season officially began. Lamar also announced that it too would return to its former home of the Southland Conference in 2023 roughly three months prior to UIW's announcement, on April 8, 2022; however, three months later, it was announced that the SLC and Lamar would be accelerating the rejoining process so that Lamar could return for the 2022 athletic season instead. 

The WAC has been speculated to move back up to FBS in the future following the reestablishment of the football conference at the FCS level.

ASUN Conference

The ASUN Conference announced that it would be adding the University of Central Arkansas, Eastern Kentucky University, and former member Jacksonville State University, as incoming members on January 29, 2021, with the intent of sponsoring football in the Football Championship Subdivision (FCS) in 2022. However, with these three schools joining in 2021, the league partnered with another conference beginning to sponsor football also in 2022, the Western Athletic Conference (WAC), to allow the three teams to join the WAC as football affiliates for 2021, branding it interchangeably as the "ASUN–WAC Challenge" and "WAC–ASUN Challenge"; the two leagues will receive a combined bid to the FCS playoffs. 

As soon as it was announced, however, the football league was thrown into jeopardy, as Jacksonville State announced it would be leaving once again in 2023 for Conference USA, an FBS conference. Liberty University was also invited to C-USA for 2023, but had already competed as an FBS independent for some time and was not included in the ASUN's new football league. With the WAC also losing Sam Houston, another football-sponsoring school, to C-USA, the two conferences announced they would be renewing their alliance for the 2022 season. On September 17, 2021, the ASUN announced Austin Peay State University, a football-sponsoring school, as a new member for the 2022–23 season.

Merger
ESPN reported on December 9, 2022 that the ASUN and WAC had agreed to form a new football-only conference that plans to start play in 2024. The initial membership would consist of Austin Peay, Central Arkansas, Eastern Kentucky, and North Alabama from the ASUN, and Abilene Christian, Southern Utah, Stephen F. Austin, Tarleton, and Utah Tech from the WAC. UTRGV would become the 10th member upon its planned addition of football in 2025. The new football conference also reportedly plans to move "from what is currently known as FCS football to what is currently known as FBS football at the earliest practicable date." On December 20, the two conferences confirmed the football merger, announcing that the new football league would start play in 2023 under the tentative name of "ASUN–WAC Football Conference". The new football league will play a six-game schedule before starting full round-robin conference play in 2024. Neither conference's announcement mentioned any plans to move to FBS.

The ASUN and WAC jointly announced on January 5, 2023 that the football conference had set up a basic governing structure and had hired Oliver Luck as executive director.

Member schools

Inaugural members

Future members

Former Members

Membership timeline

Standings

WAC-ASUN Challenge

Notes

References

 
 
Sports in the Southern United States
Sports in the Western United States
Sports organizations established in 2023
Articles which contain graphical timelines